State Route 533 (SR 533) was a short two-lane north–south state highway in west central Ohio. The entire route was turned over by the Ohio Department of Transportation (ODOT) to Logan County jurisdiction by 2014.

Route description
Following the route of County Road 5 (CR 5) northerly through the farmlands of Logan County's Jefferson Township, SR 533 had one intersection, Jefferson Township Road 127, en route to its endpoint at its junction with SR 47 at a T-intersection near the Benjamin Logan Local School District campus.

History
SR 533 was designated in 1937 along the routing that it occupied until 2014. The entire road was asphalt-paved by 1940. In the winter of 2013/2014, ODOT and the Logan County Engineer arranged a swap of roads within Logan County. All of SR 533 was re-signed as "OLD SR 533" and CR 5 (with which SR 533 was already entirely concurrent) while CR 144 and CR 144A in the southeastern part of the county became state-maintained as an extension of SR 347. Signs designating the extended county road and its status as Old SR 533 have been posted on the former state route.

Major intersections

References

External links

533
Transportation in Logan County, Ohio